Sir Colville Norbert Young  (born 20 November 1932) is a Belizean politician who served as the 2nd Governor-General of Belize. He is also a patron of the Scout Association of Belize. He was appointed as the Governor-General in 1993, taking office on 17 November of that year, and was knighted in 1994.

His tenure of 28 years is the longest of any governor-general in the history of the Commonwealth.

Education
Sir Colville studied at Belize's St Michael's College (now part of Anglican Cathedral College (ACC) and not to be confused with the institution now known as Maud Williams High School), and earned a BA degree in English from the University of the West Indies, Mona Campus, Jamaica, prior to his doctorate in linguistics from the University of York in England. Young was a Fulbright Scholar and is a member of the Caribbean Teachers of English Association and the Society for Caribbean Linguistics.

Career 
In the 1960s, Young was a member of the opposition National Independence Party. He ran as the NIP candidate for the British Honduras Legislative Assembly in the Mesopotamia constituency in 1965 and 1969, but was defeated both times by C. L. B. Rogers, the People's United Party incumbent.

Along with future Prime Minister Manuel Esquivel, Young was one of the founding members of the Liberal Party, a short-lived pro-business political party which ultimately became a part of the United Democratic Party (UDP). Afterwards Young was interested in seeing Belize's development in academia and education, and after returning from England began trying to advance the nation in that regard. In the late 1980s Young became president of the University College of Belize, one of the five parent institutions of the University of Belize, and was one of its senior lecturers.

He became involved in music, composing all manner of musical pieces from operas to cantatas to others. He published a series of books of and about Belizean literature, including Literature and Education in Belize, Creole Proverbs of Belize, From One Caribbean Corner and Caribbean Corner Calling, the last two containing poems in English and Belize Creole. Of these books, Creole Proverbs is his most recognised. In 1993, just before becoming Governor General, he published a book of short stories called Pataki Full, earning acclaim from the local writing community. His stories have been featured in the Belizean Writers Series in "Snapshots of Belize", and a play Riding Haas in the drama anthology Ping Wing Juk Me, also in the Series.

Governor-General of Belize (1993–2021)

Young became the Belizean governor-general shortly after the UDP under Esquivel regained power in the 1993 elections. He is the longest-serving governor-general of all time
in the Commonwealth. Young is active in creating and maintaining relations with foreign dignitaries and countries. He was sworn into the Privy Council upon his assumption of office. He is also active within the larger community in Belize, specifically in education and teacher training.

In 2017, several fake and unauthorized Facebook profiles were created under the name "Colville Young". Citizens were warned not to interact with the profiles as all communication from the governor is shared by the Government of Belize Press Office.

Young retired as Governor-General on 30 April 2021. Froyla Tzalam succeeded him as Governor-General on 27 May 2021.

Personal life and interests

Young is married to Lady (Norma) Young, née Trapp, and has three sons and a daughter. He has three siblings.

Young has a stated interest in promoting the development of Belizean music. Young has actively contributed to efforts in Belizean schools to maintain music as an educational staple. Young's son, Colville Young Jr., is the director of the Belize National Youth Symphony. Currently Colville Young is working with founders of the Belize Virtuosi Orchestra, Joel Nagel and Peter Illavsky, to raise funds to build a chamber orchestra auditorium in Belize. Young established the Governor General's Music in the Schools Programme which works with partner abroad to expand music in schools and access to musical instruments.

See also
 
List of national leaders
Caribbean literature

References

1932 births
Alumni of the University of York
Belizean composers
Male composers
Belizean dramatists and playwrights
Belizean musicians
Belizean novelists
Belizean short story writers
Governors-General of Belize
Knights Grand Cross of the Order of St Michael and St George
Living people
Members of the Order of the British Empire
United Democratic Party (Belize) politicians
Academic staff of the University of Belize
University of the West Indies alumni
Belizean writers